The Kosciuszko Institute  is a Polish independent, non-profit, non-governmental think tank and research institute established in Kraków in 2000. The KI's areas of expertise include European Union's and Polish institutions and law, economy, energy and climate policy, security, defence and international relations.

The institute's website states, “The mission of the Kosciuszko Institute is to contribute to the social and economic development of Poland – an active member of the European Union and a partner of the Euro-Atlantic Alliance.”

History 
The institute was founded in 2000 on the initiative of groups of individuals connected with the Jagiellonian University and the Warsaw School of Economics. Think tank started its activities under a name of the European Integration Institute.

The Kosciuszko Institute was primarily focused on developing concepts of Polish policy towards European Union that would serve national interest. After accession of Poland to the EU the KI continued to work on recommendations and analyses of EU legislation, but expanded the range of its activities.

Research areas 
 EU and Polish Institutions and Law 
 Economy & Finance 
 Energy & Climate 
 State under the Rule of Law 
 International Relations 
 Security & Defence 
 Promotion of Poland

Selected publications 
 Unconventional Gas – a Chance for Poland and Europe? Analysis and Recommendations (2011)
 V4 Cooperation in Ensuring Cyber Security – Analysis and Recommendations (2012)
 Towards a New Climate Consensus for European Economic Competitiveness – Opportunities and Challenges of the EU Climate and Energy Package (2012)
 The impact of shale gas extraction on the socio-economic development of regions – an American success story and potential opportunities for Poland (2012)
 The Analysis of the Gas Infrastructure in Poland in the Context of Prospective Energy Challenges and the Development of the Unconventional Gas Sector (2013)

External links 

2000 establishments in Poland
Think tanks established in 2000
Organisations based in Kraków
Think tanks based in Poland